Cynoglossum officinale (houndstongue, houndstooth, dog's tongue, gypsy flower, and rats and mice due to its smell) is a herbaceous plant of the family Boraginaceae.

Description
It can be either annual or biennial. Leaves are greyish and softly haired, lanceolate to oblong. Reddish-purple funnel-shaped flowers bloom between May and September. 

The plant owes its common and scientific name to the long greyish leaves that are reminiscent of a dog's tongue and were once given as a remedy for dog bites.

Distribution and habitat
Found in most parts of Europe, and also North America, where it was accidentally introduced including in British Columbia, where it is designated a noxious weed under the British Columbia Weed Control Act. It lives in wet places, sand dunes, waste land and hedges.

Ecology 
Houndstongue may be pollinated by bees, and may also self-pollinate.

Etymology
The name houndstongue (and the latin genus Cynoglossum) comes from the roughness of the leaf.

Herbalism
In 1725, houndstooth was presented in the family dictionary, Dictionaire oeconomique, as part of a cure for madness. In that book, madness was viewed as "a distemper, not only of the understanding, but also of the reason and memory, proceeding from a cold, which drys up everything it meets with that is humid in the brain." To cure madness, Dictionaire oeconomique noted: 

In the 1830s, houndstooth was known in France to be made into an emollient and diuretic for daily use in inflammatory diseases, especially of the urinary organs. To prepare as a diuretic, the houndstooth leaves were mashed, and then boiled in water to extract oils, volatile organic compounds, and other chemical substances. The mix could be sweetened with liquorice to create Ptisan of Dog's-grass. After decoction, the herbal tea was taken internally a cupful at a time.  In 1834, the Hospital of Paris provided a formula of 2/3 ss—J to Oij of water for houndstooth tea. By the end of the 1830s, doctors in England were using houndstooth as an antiaphrodisiac to combat venereal excesses.

Herbalists use the plant for piles, lung diseases, persistent coughs, baldness, sores, and ulcers but the effectiveness of all these uses is not supported by any scientific evidence.

As a weed
In 1891, the U.S. state of Michigan identified houndstooth, along with flea-bane, rag weed, burdock, cockle-bur, and stickseed, as some of the worst weeds in the state.

Toxicity
Cynoglossum officinale contains tumorigenic pyrrolizidine alkaloids. It is toxic to cows and is especially dangerous to pasture owners.

References

Further reading

External links

Species Profile - Houndstongue (Cynoglossum officinale), National Invasive Species Information Center, United States National Agricultural Library. Lists general information and resources for Houndstongue.

officinale
Flora of Europe
Medicinal plants of Europe
Plants described in 1753
Taxa named by Carl Linnaeus